Consequentialist libertarianism, also known as consequentialist liberalism or libertarian consequentialism, is a libertarian political philosophy and position that is supportive of a free market and strong private property rights only on the grounds that they bring about favorable consequences such as prosperity or efficiency.

Overview 
What consequentialist libertarians advocate is derived through cost–benefit calculation, taking a broad account of consequences. It is contrasted with deontological libertarianism which considers the initiation of force and fraud to be immoral, regardless of consequences. Unlike deontological libertarians, consequentialist libertarians do not necessarily see all cases of initiation of force as immoral and do not see it as inherently immoral (i.e. they do not express a belief in natural rights). Rather, their position is that political and economic liberty lead to the best consequences in the form of happiness and prosperity and for that reason alone it should be supported. Some libertarians may have a conception of libertarianism that is a hybrid of consequentialism and deontology.

Unlike deontological libertarians, consequentialist libertarians advocate actions they believe bring about favorable consequences regardless of whether these constitute initiation of force. Unlike deontological libertarians, some consequentialists libertarians support eminent domain in addition to support for involuntary taxes. Particular views vary among consequentialist libertarians, with political theorist David D. Friedman supporting a consequentialist form of anarcho-capitalism where the content of law is bought and sold rather than there being an established legal code forbidding initiation of force.

Notable consequentialist libertarians 
Consequentalist libertarians include Milton Friedman, David D. Friedman, Peter Leeson, Ludwig von Mises, Friedrich Hayek, and R. W. Bradford.

See also 

 Chicago school of economics
 Classical economics
 Classical liberalism
 Debates within libertarianism
 Dispersed knowledge
 Free-market environmentalism
 Geolibertarianism
 Left-libertarianism
 Natural rights libertarianism
 Night-watchman state
 Optimal tax
 Outline of libertarianism
 Pragmatism
 Public choice
 Right-libertarianism
 Subjective theory of value
 Utilitarianism

References 

Consequentialism
Libertarianism by form
Libertarian theory